Colard is both a surname and a given name. Notable people with the name include:

Jean-Christophe Colard (born 1980), French footballer
Thibault Colard (born 1992), French rower
Colard Mansion, 15th-century Flemish scribe and printer

See also
Collard (disambiguation)